The Alden Shoe Company is an American shoe company founded in 1884 by Charles H. Alden in Middleborough, Massachusetts. Alden specializes in handcrafted men's leather boots and dress shoes, such as Oxfords, Blüchers, loafers, and Chukka boots.

History
In the 19th century, there were once hundreds of shoemakers in New England, but now Alden is one of only a few factories. Alden is considered a heritage, family-owned brand. Many of the company's roughly 100 workers at its factory in Middleborough are second or third generation, and it sources its leathers mostly from small tanneries in Europe and the U.S. – its shell cordovan comes from the last such tannery in America, Horween Leather Company. Alden has used Horween as their leather supplier since 1930, and is their largest cordovan customer.

In 2021, former CFO Richard Hajjar pled guilty to embezzlement of over 30 million dollars from the company of which some 17 million he had transferred to business run by his partner Bianca de la Garza.

Commercial resilience
Along with other brands of Americana, Alden has experienced something of a resurgence in 21st century men's fashion. Despite a recession in the late-2000s and the relatively high prices of their products, Alden has grown again because of a renewed interest in more traditional men's shoes and boots, which can last decades. It is this reliance on high-end shoes, especially by those interested in business attire, that has allowed the company to avoid going under despite the decline of American shoe manufacturing.

Popular culture
In popular culture, Alden model 405 boots (commonly referred to as the Alden "Indy" boot) were worn by Harrison Ford's Indiana Jones character in the film versions of the franchise.

See also
 Allen Edmonds
 Johnston & Murphy

References

Clothing companies established in 1884
Shoe companies of the United States
Companies based in Plymouth County, Massachusetts
Companies based in Massachusetts
Shoe brands
Luxury brands
1884 establishments in Massachusetts